Işık Doğudan Yükselir  (1995) is Sezen Aksu's twelfth Turkish release and one of her most commercially successful albums in Turkey. The album marked a change, explicitly engaging a variety of Turkish folk music styles. The CD was extremely popular, making something of public figure of Aksu, who was emerging as a public voice on a variety of matters.

Track listing
 Işık Doğudan Yükselir  (Music: Sezen Aksu and Onno Tunç) Soprano Sertab Erener (Yüksel) Tenor Süha Yıldız
 Davet  (Lyrics: Sezen Aksu and Yelda Karataş / Music: Attila Özdemiroğlu)
 Son Sardunyalar  (Lyrics: Sezen Aksu and Yelda Karataş / Music: Ara Dinkjiyan)
 Alâturka  (Lyrics: Sezen Aksu / Music: Fahir Atakoğlu)
 Yaktılar Halim'imi  (Lyrics: Sezen Aksu and Meral Okay / Music: Fahir Atakoğlu)
 Rakkas  (Lyrics: Sezen Aksu and Yelda Karataş / Music: Attila Özdemiroğlu) "Lyrics Rewritten for "Salla Salla" from the soundtrack of the film Arabesk"
 Onu Alma Beni Al  (Lyrics: Sezen Aksu / Music: Arto Tunçboyacıyan)
 Yeniliğe Doğru  (Lyrics: Mevlânâ / Music: Arto Tunçboyacıyan)
 Ne Ağlarsın  (Lyrics-Music: Âşık Dâimî)
 Ben Annemi İsterim  (Lyrics-Music: Sezen Aksu)
 Var Git Turnam (Yar ko parag boyin mernem - Bingöl) (Lyrics: Sezen Aksu and Meral Okay / Armenian lyrics for the song "Bingöl" : A.İsahakian)
 La İlahe İllallah (Lyrics: Yunus Emre / Music: Sezen Aksu)

References

External links
 

1995 albums
Sezen Aksu albums
Turkish-language albums